"Stay Up! (Viagra)" is the first single released from producer-rapper 88-Keys' debut album The Death of Adam and features the album's co-executive producer Kanye West. The song samples "All Night Loving" by British R&B three-piece band Imagination. The single was released digitally on August 25, 2008. According to both artists, the song, which follows the overall storyline of the concept album, is about a man named Adam, who after a bad string of relationships, decides to take Viagra (Sildenafil Citrate) in an attempt "stay up" longer. A snippet of the track was first previewed on Kanye West's 2007 Can't Tell Me Nothing mixtape and featured an additional spoken word verse delivered by Malik Yusef.

Music video
The music video premiered across multiple MTV channels all day on Monday, March 16, 2009.

Shot in High Definition on the streets of Los Angeles, the video features 88-Keys (Clifford) and Kanye West (Rufus) dressed in full prosthetic makeup made to appear in their late sixties, out on a night on the town. Utilizing the talents of makeup artist Tony Gardner of Alterian Effects (Michael Jackson's Thriller, Hairspray, Shallow Hal, Seed of Chucky, Daft Punk) the video creates an intimate and comedic look at the two real life friends.

According to director  Jason Goldwatch,

References

External links
 Stay Up! on Myspace
 imeem Music

2008 debut singles
Kanye West songs
Songs written by Kanye West
Music videos directed by Jason Goldwatch
Songs written by Tony Swain (musician)
Songs written by Steve Jolley (songwriter)
2008 songs
Songs written by Leee John